Edwards A. Park may refer to:

 Edwards Amasa Park (1808–1900), American Congregational theologian
 Edwards A. Park (doctor) (1877–1969), American pediatrician